Vermilion is a red pigment and color.

Vermilion, Vermillion, or Vermillon may also refer to:

Places

Communities
 Vermilion, Alberta, Canada, a town
 Vermilion, Illinois, United States, a village in Illinois, United States
 Vermillion, Kansas, United States, a city
 Vermillion, Minnesota, United States, a city
 Vermilion, Ohio, United States, a city
 Vermillion, South Dakota, United States, a city

Counties, parishes, and townships
 Vermilion County, Illinois, United States
 Vermillion County, Indiana, United States
 Vermilion Parish, Louisiana, United States
 Vermilion Township (disambiguation), United States and Canada

Bodies of water
 Gulf of California, also known as the Vermilion Sea
 Lake Vermilion (disambiguation)
 Little Vermilion River (disambiguation)
 Vermilion Lakes, lakes in Alberta, Canada
 Vermillion River (disambiguation)
 Vermillion Creek, Wyoming, United States

Other places
 Vermilion Cliffs, Arizona and Utah, United States
 Vermilion Point, the site of a US Life Saving Station in Michigan on the south shore of Lake Superior
 Vermilion Range (disambiguation)

Entertainment
 Sword of Vermilion, a 1989 Sega Genesis game known in Japan as Vermilion
 Noel Vermillion, main heroine of the BlazBlue video game series
 Vermilion, a character in the Battle Arena Toshinden fighting game series
 Vermillion (album), the fourth and last album by The Three O'Clock, released in 1988
 "Vermilion" (song), a 2004 song by American metal band Slipknot
 Vermillion (Helix), a dark science fantasy comic book series published by DC Comics
 The Vermillion, an army of antagonists in the seventh season of Lego Ninjago: Masters of Spinjitzu
 The Vermillion, a group of Androids who speak for Admiral Fukyama in the second season of the television show Legion on FX

Businesses
 Vermilion Energy, a natural gas company
 Vermilion Partners Ltd, a boutique China-based investment bank

People
 Vermillion (surname), a list of people
 Vermilion tribe, a historic Native American group in Illinois

Other uses
 , several US Navy vessels
 Vermillion Institute, Hayesville, Ohio, United States, a co-educational school from the 1840s to c. 1929
 Vermilion, an imprint of Ebury Publishing (a division of Random House)
 Vermilion border, the boundary between the lip and the surrounding skin
 Vermilion flycatcher, a bird

See also